Season's Greetings from Moe is a Christmas-themed album by the American jam band Moe.

When explaining the album on the band's official website, Moe member Chuck Garvey wrote the following:

Track listing
 Carol of the Bells (Mykola Leontovych)
 Together at Christmas (Rob Derhak)
 Blue Christmas (Billy Hayes / Jay W. Johnson)
 We're a Couple of Misfits (Johnny Marks)
 Oh Hanukah (traditional)
 Home (Al Schnier)
 Silent Night/Jesu, Joy of Man's Desiring (Franz Xaver Gruber/Joseph Mohr // J.S. Bach)
 Linus and Lucy (Vince Guaraldi)
 Little Drummer Boy (Simeone/Davis/Onorati)
 Jingle Bells (James Lord Pierpont)

All songs arranged by Moe.

Personnel
Moe
Vinnie Amico – drums
Rob Derhak – bass, percussion, vocals
Chuck Garvey – guitar (acoustic, electric), percussion, vocals
Jim Loughlin – guitar (acoustic), percussion
Al Schnier – guitar, piano, vocals, moog synthesizer
Becca Childs Derhak – art direction
Bill Emmons – engineer, mixing
Catherine Henderson – vocals
Reuben Kaller – assistant engineer
Fred Kevorkian – mastering
Amy Ross – album art

References

External links
moe.crap

Moe (band) albums
2002 Christmas albums
Christmas albums by American artists
Rock Christmas albums